Herkules Maier is a 1928 German silent film directed by Alexander Esway and starring Reinhold Schünzel, Claire Rommer and Ida Perry. A travelling salesman and his wife are expecting a baby. He tries various schemes to raise money to support them both.

The film's art director was by Arthur Schwarz and Julius von Borsody.

Cast
 Reinhold Schünzel as Stadtreisender Herkules Maier  
 Claire Rommer as Maria, seine Frau  
 Ida Perry as Schwiegermutter  
 Sophie Pagay 
 Ellen Plessow 
 Ernst Behmer 
 Julius E. Herrmann 
 Albert Paulig 
 Ferry Sikla 
 Eugen Burg
 Max Ehrlich 
 Lydia Potechina 
 Gertl Grossmann 
 Carl Geppert 
 Rosa Valetti as Wirtin  
 Ludwig Stössel 
 Carla Bartheel 
 Hugo Werner-Kahle 
 Sig Arno
 Maria Kamradek 
 Paul Westermeier
 Lydia Newerowskaja 
 Arthur Schwarz

References

Bibliography
 Hans-Michael Bock and Tim Bergfelder. The Concise Cinegraph: An Encyclopedia of German Cinema. Berghahn Books.

External links

1928 films
Films of the Weimar Republic
Films directed by Alexander Esway
German silent feature films
German black-and-white films
UFA GmbH films